Donald Campbell (1921–1967) was a British car and motorboat racer.

Donald Campbell may also refer to:

Religious figures
 Donald Campbell (abbot) (died 1562), Scottish noble and churchman
 Donald Campbell (bishop) (1894–1963), Roman Catholic Archbishop of Glasgow

Sportspeople
 Donald Campbell (Australian cricketer) (1851–1887), Australian cricketer
 Donald Campbell (Zimbabwean cricketer) (born 1974), Zimbabwean cricketer
 Donald Campbell (rugby union) (1919–1944), Chilean rugby union player
 Donald Campbell (athlete) (1926–2017), American former sprinter
 Don Campbell (American football) (1916–1991), American football player
 Don Campbell (ice hockey) (1925–2012), Canadian ice hockey player
 Don Campbell (dancer) (1951–2020), American dancer who invented locking
 Don Campbell (footballer) (1932–2016), English footballer
 Don Campbell (cyclist) (born 1975), Caymanian former cyclist

Politicians
 Sir Donald Campbell, 1st Baronet (1800–1850), British politician and Lieutenant-Governor Prince Edward Island
 Donald Campbell (Texas politician) (1830–1871), lieutenant governor of Texas and Texas senator
 Donald Campbell (Australian politician) (1866–1945), member of the South Australian House of Assembly
 Donald A. Campbell (1922–1992), New York politician
 Donald James Campbell (1932–1984), politician in British Columbia, Canada
 Donald Wilfred Campbell, former (1993–1997) Canadian ambassador to Japan

Military figures
 Donald M. Campbell Jr. (born 1955), American army general
 Donald Campbell (British Army officer) (died 1763), British officer killed in Pontiac's Rebellion
 Donald Campbell (Royal Navy officer) (1788–1856), British admiral

Others
 Donald Campbell (engineer), British railway engineer
 Donald Campbell (traveller) (1751–1804), Scottish traveller in India and the Middle East
 Donald B. Campbell, Australian-born astronomer
 Donald K. Campbell, former (1986–1994) president of Dallas Theological Seminary
 Donald L. Campbell (1904–2002), American chemical engineer
 Donald T. Campbell (1916–1996), American social scientist, noted for his work in methodology
 Sir Donald Campbell, 1st Baronet, of Ardnamurchan and Airds (died 1651), Scottish nobleman
 Don Campbell (musician), British reggae singer
 Don "Magic" Juan (born 1950), American 'spiritual advisor' to Snoop Dogg
 Donald Campbell (priest) (1886–1930), Anglican priest
 Donald Campbell (anaesthetist) (1930–2004), dean of the Royal College of Anaesthetists